The Sega CD, originally released as the  in most regions outside of North America and Brazil, is an add-on device for the Sega Genesis video game console, designed and produced by Sega. It was released in Japan in 1991, North America in 1992 and in PAL regions in 1993. The device adds a CD-ROM drive to the console, allowing the user to play CD-based games and providing additional hardware functionality.  It can also play audio CDs and CD+G discs.  While the add-on did contain a faster central processing unit than the Genesis, as well as some enhanced graphics capabilities, the main focus of the device was to expand the size of games. Known for several games such as Sonic CD and for the controversy of violent video games including Night Trap, the Sega CD sold 2.24 million units worldwide. It was officially discontinued in 1996.

Among the titles released for the Sega CD were a number of FMV games, including Sewer Shark and Fahrenheit.  Well-known titles include the critically acclaimed Sonic CD and Lunar: Eternal Blue, as well as the controversial Night Trap, which resulted in Congressional hearings on video game violence.  The Sega CD also received enhanced ports of games from the Genesis, including Batman Returns and Ecco the Dolphin.  Included in this library are six games which, while receiving individual Sega CD releases, also received separate versions that utilized both the Sega CD and Sega 32X add-ons.  In particular, Sonic CD has been noted for its excellent graphics and new time travel elements without changing the traditional Sonic formula.  However, given the large amount of FMV games and Genesis ports, the Sega CD's game library has been criticized for its lack of depth.  Full motion video quality was poor on the Sega CD due to poor video compression software and the system's limited color palette, and the concept never caught on with the public.  Likewise, most Genesis ports for the Sega CD added in additional full motion video sequences, extra levels, and enhanced audio, but were otherwise the same game as the Genesis release.  The video in these sequences have also been criticized, with the quality being considered comparable to an old VHS tape.

The following list contains all of the games released on the Sega CD.  Of these games, there are six titles (marked with a † in the title for the game) that were also released in formats that used a combination of the Sega CD and the Sega 32X.  All release years given are for the earliest release of the games, which have been sold in several regions around the world, including Japan, North America, and Europe.  A total of  titles are listed. 57 were released only in Japan, 39 were released only in North America, and 5 were released only in Europe.

Games

Non-game software

See also
List of Sega Genesis games
List of Sega 32X games
List of cancelled games for Sega consoles
List of Sega video game franchises

References

Sega CD
CD